Ugar Budruk  is a village in the southern state of Karnataka, India. It is located in the Athni taluk of Belgaum district in Karnataka. It is around 38 km from the city of Sangli, Maharashtra. Ugar comes under the Kagwad constituency.

"Budruk" is a place designation meaning 'big'. Ugar Budruk has been gradually outgrown by the nearby town Ugar Khurd ('small Ugar'), which has a population of about 24,000.

Demographics
 India census, Ugar Budruk had a population of 9770 with 5072 males and 4698 females. Ugar Budruk is famous for Sri Padmavati Devi temple and Dasara festival called "Holi Pooja"(nadi pooja). About 75% of Jain population will be found in this village.
There are two convent schools viz. JLC school and JET school providing quality education to children from LKG to Matriculation, also two Government schools are there. The main source of income for the people in this village is agriculture and the basic crop is Sugar Cane, but with advancement in irrigation and other agri facilities people are moving towards more commercial crops like grape yard etc.

See also
 Belgaum
 Districts of Karnataka

References

External links
 http://Belgaum.nic.in/

Villages in Belagavi district